Christmas (Spanish: Navidad) is a 2009 Chilean-French drama film directed by Sebastián Lelio and written by Leilo & Gonzalo Maza. Starring Manuela Martelli, Diego Ruiz and Alicia Rodríguez.

Synopsis 
Alejandro and Aurora, a teenage couple, leave Santiago to spend Christmas at Aurora's family home at the foot of the Andes. However, Alejandro's frustrations and Aurora's doubts about her sexual identity create tensions that threaten to end their relationship. Things take an unexpected turn when they come across Alicia, a fragile 16-year-old who has run away from home. As they gather around an improvised Christmas tree, the couple becomes fascinated by the enigmatic Alicia, who gradually becomes the object of their desire. Despite the city's celebrations, the three orphans find solace in each other's company and embark on a unique and sentimental relationship that helps them overcome their loneliness.

Cast 
The actors participating in this film are:

 Manuela Martelli as Aurora.
 Diego Ruiz as Alejandro.
 Alicia Rodríguez as Alicia.

Release 
Christmas had its international premiere on May 21, 2009, at the 2009 Cannes International Film Festival as part of the Directors' Fortnight. Subsequently, the film was screened at the Viña del Mar International Film Festival where it won the Award for the Best Film Direction. It was commercially released on August 20, 2009, in Chilean theaters. It was released on November 4, 2009, in French theaters.

References

External links 

 

2009 films
2009 drama films
Chilean drama films
French drama films
2000s French films
Films directed by Sebastián Lelio
2000s Spanish-language films
Chilean Christmas films
French Christmas drama films
Films set in Chile
Films shot in Chile
Films about teenagers